The Minister for Culture (formally cabinet minister and head of the Ministry for Culture) is a member and minister of the Swedish Government and appointed by the Prime Minister. The minister heads the Ministry for Culture and is responsible for cultural issues and construction.

Before 1 December 1991, the cultural issues were handled by the Ministry of Education. Between 1991 and 2004, and from 2006 it's a separate ministry. In the years between 2004 and 2006, the issues were handled by the Ministry of Education and Culture.

The current Minister for Culture is  Parisa Liljestrand, who was appointed on 18 October 2022.

List of Ministers for Culture 

Status'''

Deputy Ministers in the Ministry of Culture

See also 
 Politics in Sweden
 Culture minister
 Ministry of Culture

References

External links 

 Official website